Edwin Roberto Sandez Cota (born 7 June 1994) is a Mexican professional footballer who currently plays for Coras de Nayarit F.C.

Hailing from Cabo San Lucas, he joined his hometown club Los Cabos F.C. in September 2020.

References

External links
 
 

1994 births
Living people
Chiapas F.C. footballers
Tuxtla F.C. footballers
Gavilanes de Matamoros footballers
Coras de Nayarit F.C. footballers
Liga MX players
Liga Premier de México players
Tercera División de México players
Liga de Balompié Mexicano players
Footballers from Baja California Sur
Mexican footballers
Association football midfielders
Association football defenders
People from Cabo San Lucas